Taintstick was a satirical American hard rock band, signed to Suburban Noize Records. Their debut album released on October 27, 2009.  In 2010, front man Jason Ellis, announced the end of the band after EllisMania 6 and the premiere of his new band, Death! Death! Die!.

Taintstick's music is regularly featured on Sirius XM radio's Faction (Sirius XM) channel, which has also broadcast extended programs featuring interviews with band members, and behind-the-scenes looks at the making of their album.

Live performances
To date, the band has played three live shows.  In October 2009, Taintstick performed with new member, bass guitarist Benji Madden from Good Charlotte at the club Wasted Space, in the Hard Rock Hotel and Casino in Las Vegas, NV. RawDog was on stage playing the keyboard and triangle after losing his bass player spot to Madden. When playing in October 2009, Blasko, bassist for Ozzy Osbourne jumped on stage and played bass for Tainstick's tribute to "Crazy Train".

The second show was announced for December 30, 2009 at the Roxy Theatre (West Hollywood) in West Hollywood, CA. Taintstick played before headliner and Subnoize labelmates Unwritten Law. Lead singer and founder, Jason Ellis, said on his live EllisMania.com show that the record label owner said "He thinks Taintstick could be something big and he's never seen a band win the crowd over like that in the 15 years he's been involved in the music business and that if I wanted to take it serious that we could really make a go of it, so maybe I will."

The third show they have performed at was at SRH fest 2010. They performed just after The Pricks and just before Kutt Calhoun.

Music videos
Released on October 20, 2008, the video for their debut single "Apple Juice", featuring celebrities Tony Hawk, Rob Dyrdek, Amber Smith, Heidi Cortez, Angie Savage, Mayhem Miller, Ryo Chonan, King Mo, has over 180,000 views on YouTube.

The band has finished shooting the video for their second single "Monkeys Of War." It was reported during a segment on "The Jason Ellis Show" by Tully that the video will be released closer to the release of their debut album. The video was eventually included with their debut album, Six Pounds of Sound, as part of a DVD bonus disk.

Discography

Albums

Awards and achievements
Gibson Guitars selected Taintstick as one of "Today's Five Worst Band Names."

Members

Jason Ellis — Vocals
Christian Hand — Drums, Production
Michael Tully —  Guitar
Josh Richmond — Cowbell, Triangle, Keyboard

References

Hard rock musical groups from California
Suburban Noize Records artists